The 58th British Academy Film Awards, given by the British Academy of Film and Television Arts, took place on 12 February 2005 and honoured the best films of 2004.

The Aviator won Best Film, Best Supporting Actress for Cate Blanchett, Best Production Design, and Best Makeup and Hair. Jamie Foxx and Imelda Staunton won Best Actor and Best Actress for Ray and Vera Drake, respectively. Vera Drake also won Best Director for Mike Leigh and Best Costume Design. My Summer of Love, directed by Paweł Pawlikowski, was voted Outstanding British Film of 2004.

Winners and nominees

Statistics

See also
 77th Academy Awards
 30th César Awards
 10th Critics' Choice Awards
 57th Directors Guild of America Awards
 18th European Film Awards
 62nd Golden Globe Awards
 25th Golden Raspberry Awards
 9th Golden Satellite Awards
 19th Goya Awards
 20th Independent Spirit Awards
 10th Lumières Awards
 16th Producers Guild of America Awards
 31st Saturn Awards
 11th Screen Actors Guild Awards
 57th Writers Guild of America Awards

Sources
 http://www.ew.com/ew/article/0,,1018223,00.html  Aviator leads BAFTAs with 14 nominations
 http://news.bbc.co.uk/2/hi/entertainment/4260957.stm Aviator wins Best Film
 http://news.bbc.co.uk/2/hi/entertainment/4261145.stm Stars on Red Carpet

Film058
2004 film awards
2005 in British cinema
February 2005 events in the United Kingdom
2005 in London
2004 awards in the United Kingdom